For the Love of God is a 2007 award-winning short animation starring Steve Coogan and Ian McKellen, directed by Joe Tucker, and produced at the National Film & Television School.

The film tells the story of Graham, a man living under the glare of his overbearing mother in their Christian bookshop, who wants to have sex with God.

In 2007, it was the only British film in official competition at the Cannes Film Festival. It won a number of international awards including a Silver Hugo at Chicago International Film Festival and Best Animation at Santa Barbara International Film Festival and Rhode Island International Film Festival.

References

2007 animated films
British animated short films
2007 films
2000s English-language films
2000s British films